The Pageants was a shipyard in Rotherhithe on the River Thames, London.  It was established in the early 18th century and one of its first occupants was John Buxton of Deptford. After being used by Buxton for construction of Navy ships between 1741 and 1744 the yard fell into decline, possibly being used to store timber and later as a ship-breakers.

References 

History of the London Borough of Southwark
Shipyards on the River Thames